David Norman Yazbek (born 1961) is an American writer, musician, composer, and lyricist. He wrote the music and lyrics for the Broadway musicals The Full Monty (2000), Dirty Rotten Scoundrels (2005), Women on the Verge of a Nervous Breakdown (2010), The Band's Visit (2017), and Tootsie (2019).

Early life
Yazbek was born in New York City. His father is of Lebanese descent, and his mother was of half Italian and half Jewish ancestry. He began cello lessons in elementary school and took up the piano as a teenager. He attended Riverdale Country School.

While attending Brown University as an undergraduate, he wrote an original musical with the production group Brownbrokers before graduating in 1982. He also directed a production of Hair with the student theatre group Production Workshop, for which he composed an original song to complement the classic score. After college he got a job writing for David Letterman's late-night television show. He won an Emmy Award as part of Letterman's writing team in 1986, but quit to pursue his love of music. From 1987 to 1989 he was the co-owner of Manhattan Recording Company and wrote many commercial jingles.

Career
An accomplished musician, Yazbek has released five rock albums to date which highlight his unique perspective and wry sense of humor. He has also written many songs and background music for children's television shows, especially those produced for Disney's cable television channel. He also co-wrote the theme song to the Emmy award winning PBS-TV series Where in The World Is Carmen Sandiego? with songwriter Sean Altman, a high school friend who led the show's featured vocal group, Rockapella. Yazbek and Altman also composed and wrote the theme song to World successor, Where in Time Is Carmen Sandiego?

Yazbek has produced tracks for the band XTC, and its lead singer Andy Partridge has collaborated on Yazbek's solo albums. He also has written for or produced recordings by Spacehog, Tito Puente, The Persuasions, and Queen Sarah Saturday. XTC also contributed a track to the Carmen Sandiego soundtrack album, which Yazbek produced.

In 2000, director Jack O'Brien approached composer-lyricist Adam Guettel to write the music and lyrics for a musical based on the hit movie The Full Monty. Guettel declined, but recommended Yazbek, with whom he had played in a band. Yazbek took the job, collaborating with librettist Terrence McNally. The show was a success, although it was overshadowed that year by Mel Brooks' musical The Producers. The Full Monty ran for two years before closing, and for his work Yazbek was nominated for the Tony Award for Best Original Score and the Drama Desk Award for Outstanding Lyrics, and won the Drama Desk Award for Outstanding Music. In 2002 he was a contributing lyricist for the musical Bombay Dreams.

Yazbek wrote the music and lyrics to the musical adaptation of Dirty Rotten Scoundrels, which opened on Broadway in 2005, featuring John Lithgow, Norbert Leo Butz, Sherie Rene Scott, Joanna Gleason, and Gregory Jbara. Yazbek was again nominated for the 2005 Tony Award for Best Original Score, and Drama Desk Awards for Outstanding Music and Outstanding Lyrics.

Yazbek wrote the music for the musical adaptation of the 1988 Pedro Almodóvar film Women on the Verge of a Nervous Breakdown. In October 2009, the musical had a closed reading directed by Bartlett Sher and featuring Salma Hayek, Jessica Biel, Matthew Morrison, and Paulo Szot. The musical opened on Broadway at the Belasco Theatre on November 4, 2010, with previews starting October 8. The musical starred Patti LuPone, Brian Stokes Mitchell, and Sherie Rene Scott, with direction by Bartlett Sher. The production received mixed to negative reviews, despite praise for the actors and Yazbek's score, and closed on January 2, 2011, after 30 previews and 69 performances. Despite the early closing, the show was nominated for three Tony Awards, for the performances of Patti LuPone and Laura Benanti, and Yazbek's score.

Yazbek wrote the music and lyrics for the musical adaptation of the film The Band's Visit, with a book by Itamar Moses. The musical premiered Off-Broadway at the Atlantic Theatre Company Linda Gross Theater on November 11, 2016, in previews. The cast featured John Cariani and Tony Shalhoub with direction by David Cromer. This production won him the 2017 Obie Award for Musical Theatre and later the production transferred to the Ethel Barrymore Theatre on Broadway. Yazbek won the Tony Award for Best Original Score for his efforts on this show.

Yazbek wrote the music and lyrics for the musical adaptation of the 1982 film Tootsie, with a book by Robert Horn. It opened in Chicago at the Cadillac Palace Theatre in September 2018 and opened on Broadway in March 2019. The show was nominated for eleven Tony Awards, including for Yazbek's score. The show won two awards: Best Book of a Musical and Best Performance by an Actor in a Leading Role in a Musical (Santino Fontana).

In 2022, Yazbek reunited with Itamar Moses for the book, and Erik Della Penna for the music and lyrics for the musical  Dead Outlaw, based on a true story, and had a premiere presentation at Feinstein's/54 Below.

Unrealized projects
In 2007, Yazbek began developing the music and lyrics for Bruce Lee: Journey to the West, a stage musical based on the life of martial artist Bruce Lee. Bruce Lee would feature a book by David Henry Hwang and be directed by Bartlett Sher. Variety reported that the musical was aiming to open on Broadway during the 2010–2011 season, but these plans have been put on indefinite hold.

On June 12, 2013, it was announced that Yazbek would be replacing the Barenaked Ladies to write the score to the musical adaptation of National Lampoon's Animal House, with a book by Michael Mitnick.

Awards and nominations

Discography

As solo artist

As musical composer

Other contributions

References

External links
Official site
Production: The Full Monty – Working in the Theatre Seminar video at American Theatre Wing, September 2000
Production: Dirty Rotten Scoundrels – Working in the Theatre Seminar video at American Theatre Wing, April 2005
Pop Music and the New Musical – Working in the Theatre Seminar video at American Theatre Wing, September 2005
Interview and career timeline in the San Francisco Chronicle

American musical theatre composers
American musical theatre lyricists
Broadway composers and lyricists
Jewish American composers
Jewish American songwriters
1960 births
Living people
American beatboxers
American people of Italian descent
American people of Lebanese descent
Grammy Award winners
Primetime Emmy Award winners
Songwriters from New York (state)
Tony Award winners
Drama Desk Award winners
Brown University alumni
21st-century American Jews